Aporesthus is a genus of beetles in the family Carabidae, containing the following species:

 Aporesthus anomalus (Bates, 1871)
 Aporesthus suturalis (Liebke, 1951)
 Aporesthus titschacki (Liebke, 1951)

References

Lebiinae